1989 Grand Prix may refer to:

 1989 Grand Prix (snooker)
 1989 Grand Prix (tennis)